Gregg L. Cunningham (born May 30, 1947) is a Republican former member of the Pennsylvania House of Representatives. He is now Executive Director of the Center for Bio-Ethical Reform, an anti-abortion advocacy group.

References

Republican Party members of the Pennsylvania House of Representatives
Living people
1947 births